Incarcha argentilinea is a species of snout moth found in Peru. It was first described by Herbert Druce in 1910.

References

External links
Original description: Druce, Herbert (1910). "Descriptions of some new Species of Heterocera from East and West Africa and Tropical South America". Annals and Magazine of Natural History. (8) 6 (32): 181–182. – via the Biodiversity Heritage Library.

Epipaschiinae
Moths of South America